Eimear Moynan is a camogie player, winner of a Soaring Star award in 2009.

References

Living people
Year of birth missing (living people)
Laois camogie players